Hairy nightshade is a common name for several plants and may refer to:

Solanum physalifolium
Solanum sarrachoides
Solanum villosum